Debranching enzyme could refer to:
Glycogen debranching enzyme, acts on the polysaccharide glycogen
DBR1 (RNA lariat debranching enzyme), acts on introns
Isoamylase